The Swedish Union for Service and Communications Employees (SEKO) is a trade union in Sweden.

History
The union was founded on 14 May 1970, as the Swedish National Union of State Employees (SF).  It resulted from the merger of eight unions:

 Employees' Union of State Power Stations
 Swedish Civil Administration's Employees' Union
 Swedish Defence Forces Civilian Employees' Union
 Swedish Post Union
 Swedish Prison Employees' Union
 Swedish Railway Employees' Union
 Swedish Road Workers' Union
 Swedish Tele Union

Like all its predecessors, the union affiliated to the Swedish Trade Union Confederation.  On formation, it had 145,350 members, and it grew to 161,794 in 1986.  The National Association of Civil Servants in Prisons split away in 1973.

In 1995, the union became SEKO.  The following year, the Swedish Sailors' Union merged in, then in 1997 the Swedish Association of Engine Drivers split away.  By 2019, it had a membership of 70,818.

The union is divided into nine branches:

Rail transportation
Public administration
Postal
Roads & Railways
Telecom
Correctional treatment
Energy
Defence
Maritime

Presidents
1970: Gustaf Kolare
1973: Lars-Erik Nicklasson
1984: Curt Persson
1995: Gunnar Erlandsson
1998: Sven-Olof Arbestål
2002: Janne Rudén
2017: Valle Karlsson
2021: Gabriella Lavecchia

References

External links
 
 Open UP - handicap programme in Sweden (model based on Norwegian Telenor's handicap programme) official site.

Swedish Trade Union Confederation
Trade unions in Sweden
Trade unions established in 1970
1970 establishments in Sweden
Public Services International
UNI Global Union